Dorian van Rijsselberghe (born 24 November 1988, in Den Burg) is a sailor (windsurfer) from the Netherlands. 

He won his first Dutch title when he was 13. 

Van Rijsselberghe on the Dutch RS:X won the gold medals at the 2012 Olympics in Weymouth, and the 2016 Olympics in Rio de Janeiro.

Personal life
Van Rijsselberghe was a student at CIOS. Van Rijsselberghe is married and has two daughters.

2012 Olympics
Van Rijsselberghe dominated the competition completely by finishing first among the 38 competitors in 7 out of 10 races, second twice and third once. After the ninth race, he had accumulated a sufficient lead over the second placed Nick Dempsey to be certain to win the gold medal – as long as he competed in the remaining races – irrespective of his results in the 10th race and in the medal race.

Further reading

References

External links
 
 
 
 

 
 

Living people
1988 births
People from Texel
Dutch windsurfers
Sailors at the 2012 Summer Olympics – RS:X
Sailors at the 2016 Summer Olympics – RS:X
Olympic sailors of the Netherlands
Dutch male sailors (sport)
Medalists at the 2012 Summer Olympics
Medalists at the 2016 Summer Olympics
Olympic gold medalists for the Netherlands
Olympic medalists in sailing
Knights of the Order of Orange-Nassau
RS:X class world champions
Sportspeople from North Holland